Graphium adamastor, the Boisduval's white lady, is a butterfly in the family Papilionidae (swallowtails). It is found in Guinea, Sierra Leone, Mali, Burkina Faso, Ivory Coast, Ghana, Togo, Benin, Nigeria, Cameroon, the Republic of the Congo, the Central African Republic and the Democratic Republic of the Congo.

Description
G.adamastor is very similar to the preceding species Graphium agamedes and only differs in that the transverse spot of the cell of the forewing is larger and reaches the front margin of the cell, the discal spot in cellule 2 on the contrary is smaller and rounded or entirely wanting, so that the median hand is here interrupted. — Ashanti and Togo.

Biology
Its habitat consists of dry forests and the transition zone between forests and the Guinea savanna.

Adult females mimic Amauris damocles.  Both sexes feed from flowers, including Calodendrum splendens.

The larvae feed on various Annonaceae species.

Taxonomy
Graphium adamastor belongs to a species group with 16 members. All are very similar
The species group members are:
Graphium abri Smith & Vane-Wright, 2001 
Graphium adamastor  (Boisduval, 1836) 
Graphium agamedes (Westwood, 1842)
Graphium almansor (Honrath, 1884)
Graphium auriger (Butler, 1876) 
Graphium aurivilliusi (Seeldrayers, 1896)
Graphium fulleri  (Grose-Smith, 1883)
Graphium hachei (Dewitz, 1881)
Graphium kigoma Carcasson, 1964
Graphium olbrechtsi Berger, 1950
Graphium poggianus (Honrath, 1884)
Graphium rileyi Berger, 1950
Graphium schubotzi (Schultze, 1913)
Graphium simoni (Aurivillius, 1899),
Graphium ucalegon  (Hewitson, 1865)[
Graphium ucalegonides (Staudinger, 1884)

References

adamastor
Butterflies described in 1836
Taxa named by Jean Baptiste Boisduval
Butterflies of Africa